The NWA Macon Tag Team Championship was a tag team professional wrestling championship in Georgia Championship Wrestling, defended exclusively on events held at the Macon City Auditorium and Macon Coliseum in Macon, Georgia. The title lasted from 1969 to 1975.

Title history

References

Georgia Championship Wrestling championships
National Wrestling Alliance championships
Tag team wrestling championships